Nirmal district is a district located in the northern region of the Indian state of Telangana. The district headquarters is located in the town of Nirmal. It borders the Telangana districts of Adilabad, Nizamabad, Mancherial, Asifabad, Jagtial districts as well as Nanded district of the state Maharashtra.

Geography
The district is situated on the Deccan Plateau comprising fertile lands drained by the Godavari River, that flows along its southern boundary. The district is landlocked; It shares boundaries with Adilabad to the north, Komaram Bheem to the northeast, Mancherial to the east, Jagityal and Nizamabad (along with the Godavari) to the south and Nanded District of Maharashtra to the west.

Demographics

 Census of India, the district had a population of 709,418. The district has the highest female to male ratio in Telangana, with 1046 females to 1000 males. More than 78% of the population lives in rural areas. With only 185 people per km2, the district has the 6th lowest population density among all of the districts in Telangana. The literacy rate is 58%. There are 376,760 labourers and 126,363 farmers. Scheduled Castes and Scheduled Tribes make up 15.24% and 11.36% of the population respectively.

At the time of the 2011 census, 65.52% of the population spoke Telugu, 13.54% Urdu, 10.88% Marathi, 6.43% Lambadi and 1.52% Gondi as their first language.

Administration
The district has two revenue divisions of Nirmal and Bhainsa, which are in-turn sub-divided into 19 mandals.

Tourism and culture
Sri Ram Sagar Project is located at the border of the Nirmal and Nizamabad districts.  It is the center of attraction for tourists.

Kadem Project, Saraswati Temple Basar, Kawal Tiger Reserve Kadem, Sadarmat are all major tourist destinations in Nirmal.

See also
 List of districts in Telangana

References

 
Districts of Telangana